Santa Ana is the ninth canton in the San José province of Costa Rica.  It is located in the Central Valley. The canton borders the Alajuela canton to the north, the Mora canton to the south and west, the Escazú canton to the east, as well as the Belén canton to the north east. The canton has the highest Human Development Index of any canton in Costa Rica as of 2021 with a HDI of 0.935.

Toponymy

The first mention of the name appears in the Protocols of Cartago on December 1, 1658, when part of the land which now conforms the canton became property of José de Alvarado and Petronilla de Retes after their marriage. The name of the lands comes from the original owner of the lands, Jerónimo de Retes y López de Ortega, father of Petronilla. Ortega was seeded the land in the 17th century by the Spanish crown as a recognition for his work as sheriff of Cartago. Popular belief is that he named his lands in honour of Saint Anne.

History 
Santa Ana was created on 29 August 1907 by decree 8.

Geography 
Santa Ana has an area of  km2 and a mean elevation of  metres.

The triangular-shaped canton is delineated by the Virilla River on the north and stretches south as it narrows to include a portion of the Cerros de Escazú.

Districts 
The canton of Santa Ana is subdivided into the following districts:
 Santa Ana
 Salitral
 Pozos
 Uruca
 Piedades
 Brasil

Demographics 

For the 2011 census, Santa Ana had a population of  inhabitants.

Transportation

Road transportation 
The canton is covered by the following road routes:

Culture

Symbols

Roble de Sabana
The Tabebuia rosea (nicknamed "Roble de Sabana", meaning Savannah Oak) is native to Costa Rica, and can be seen in the country’s warm areas. It was declared a symbol of the canton by Santa Ana's Municipal Council in ordinary session n.267 held on June 23rd , 2015. The tree can also be seen of the canton's seal and flag.

Notable people
This is a list of people born or that have lived in Santa Ana.

Marcia González Aguiluz: Lawyer with an emphasis on environmental law. She was the president of the Citizens' Action Party between 2017 and 2018, as well as former minister of justice and peace under president Carlos Alvarado Quesada. 
María Luisa Ávila Agüero: A Pediatric subspecializing in infectious diseases who was the minister of health under presidents Óscar Arias Sánchez and Laura Chinchilla. 
Michael Umaña: Former football player who played as a defender.
Carlos Martínez: Football player who currently plays at A.D. San Carlos as a defender.

References 

Cantons of San José Province
Populated places in San José Province
Andrés Bello
Greater Metropolitan Area (Costa Rica)